Raphitoma brunneofasciata is a species of sea snail, a marine gastropod mollusk in the family Raphitomidae.

References

 Pusateri F., Giannuzzi-Savelli R. & Oliverio M. 2013. A revision of the Mediterranean Raphitomidae 2: On the sibling species Raphitoma lineolata (B.D.D., 1883) and Raphitoma smriglioi n. sp. Iberus, 31(1): 11-20 page(s): 18;

External links
 Gastropods.com: Raphitoma brunneofasciata
 Biolib.cz: Raphitoma brunneofasciata

brunneofasciata
Gastropods described in 2013